The Ambassador of Malaysia to the Republic of Cuba is the head of Malaysia's diplomatic mission to Cuba. The position has the rank and status of an Ambassador Extraordinary and Plenipotentiary and is based in the Embassy of Malaysia, Havana.

List of heads of mission

Ambassadors to Cuba

See also
 Cuba–Malaysia relations

References 

 
Cuba
Malaysia